The 1990–91 NBA season was the Timberwolves' 2nd season in the National Basketball Association. The Timberwolves received the sixth pick in the 1990 NBA draft, and selected Felton Spencer out of Louisville University. After playing one year at the Hubert H. Humphrey Metrodome, the Timberwolves moved into their new arena known as the Target Center, which opened on October 13, 1990. They played their first game there on November 2 defeating the Dallas Mavericks 98–85 before a sold out crowd of 19,006. However, the Timberwolves continued to struggle in their second season finishing fifth in the Midwest Division with a 29–53 record, despite posting a solid 7–5 record in April.

Tony Campbell continued to lead the T-Wolves in scoring averaging 21.8 points per game, plus contributing 1.6 steals per game, while Tyrone Corbin averaged 18.0 points, 7.2 rebounds and 2.0 steals per game, and second-year star Pooh Richardson provided the team with 17.1 points, 9.0 assists and 1.6 steals per game. In addition, second-year forward Sam Mitchell contributed 14.6 points and 6.3 rebounds per game, and Spencer provided with 7.1 points, 7.9 rebounds and 1.5 blocks per game, and was selected to the NBA All-Rookie Second Team.

Draft picks

Roster

Regular season

Season standings

y - clinched division title
x - clinched playoff spot

z - clinched division title
y - clinched division title
x - clinched playoff spot

Record vs. opponents

Game log

Regular season

|- align="center" bgcolor="#ffcccc"
| 2
| November 3
| @ Milwaukee
|- align="center" bgcolor="#ffcccc"
| 3
| November 6
| @ Indiana
|- align="center" bgcolor="#ffcccc"
| 4
| November 7
| Chicago
| L 91–96
|
|
|
| Target Center
| 1–3
|- align="center" bgcolor="#ffcccc"
| 7
| November 13
| @ Houston
|- align="center" bgcolor="#ffcccc"
| 9
| November 18
| Utah
| L 94–103
|
|
|
| Target Center
| 3–6
|- align="center" bgcolor="#ffcccc"
| 11
| November 21
| @ San Antonio
|- align="center" bgcolor="#ffcccc"
| 12
| November 25
| Houston
|- align="center" bgcolor="#ffcccc"
| 14
| November 29
| @ Portland
| L 92–107
|
|
|
| Memorial Coliseum
| 5–9
|- align="center" bgcolor="#ffcccc"
| 15
| November 30
| @ Utah
| L 79–96
|
|
|
| Salt Palace
| 5–10

|- align="center" bgcolor="#ccffcc"
| 17
| December 4
| Indiana
|- align="center" bgcolor="#ffcccc"
| 18
| December 6
| L.A. Lakers
| L 73–83
|
|
|
| Target Center
| 6–12
|- align="center" bgcolor="#ffcccc"
| 20
| December 13
| New York
|- align="center" bgcolor="#ffcccc"
| 21
| December 15
| San Antonio
|- align="center" bgcolor="#ffcccc"
| 23
| December 19
| @ Phoenix
|- align="center" bgcolor="#ffcccc"
| 24
| December 22
| @ Golden State
| L 102–115
|
|
|
| Oakland–Alameda County Coliseum Arena
| 7–17
|- align="center" bgcolor="#ffcccc"
| 25
| December 23
| @ L.A. Lakers
| L 94–118
|
|
|
| Great Western Forum
| 7–18
|- align="center" bgcolor="#ffcccc"
| 26
| December 28
| Detroit
| L 85–97
|
|
|
| Target Center
| 7–19
|- align="center" bgcolor="#ccffcc"
| 27
| December 30
| Seattle

|- align="center" bgcolor="#ffcccc"
| 30
| January 5
| @ Atlanta
|- align="center" bgcolor="#ffcccc"
| 31
| January 7
| Phoenix
|- align="center" bgcolor="#ffcccc"
| 34
| January 15
| Portland
| L 117–132
|
|
|
| Target Center
| 11–23
|- align="center" bgcolor="#ccffcc"
| 35
| January 16
| @ New York
|- align="center" bgcolor="#ccffcc"
| 36
| January 19
| Golden State
| W 121–113
|
|
|
| Target Center
| 13–23
|- align="center" bgcolor="#ffcccc"
| 38
| January 24
| @ Houston
|- align="center" bgcolor="#ffcccc"
| 39
| January 26
| @ San Antonio
|- align="center" bgcolor="#ffcccc"
| 40
| January 28
| Boston
| L 87–108
|
|
|
| Target Center
| 13–27

|- align="center" bgcolor="#ccffcc"
| 43
| February 3
| Philadelphia
| W 110–102 (2OT)
|
|
|
| Target Center
| 15–28
|- align="center" bgcolor="#ccffcc"
| 44
| February 5
| Utah
| W 94–93
|
|
|
| Target Center
| 16–28
|- align="center" bgcolor="#ffcccc"
| 46
| February 12
| @ Golden State
| L 105–126
|
|
|
| Oakland–Alameda County Coliseum Arena
| 16–30
|- align="center" bgcolor="#ffcccc"
| 47
| February 13
| @ L.A. Lakers
| L 106–120
|
|
|
| Great Western Forum
| 16–31
|- align="center" bgcolor="#ffcccc"
| 49
| February 16
| @ Utah
| L 107–115
|
|
|
| Salt Palace
| 16–33
|- align="center" bgcolor="#ffcccc"
| 51
| February 20
| Golden State
| L 105–108
|
|
|
| Target Center
| 17–34
|- align="center" bgcolor="#ffcccc"
| 53
| February 24
| Houston
|- align="center" bgcolor="#ffcccc"
| 54
| February 27
| @ Boston
| L 111–116
|
|
|
| Boston Garden
| 18–37

|- align="center" bgcolor="#ccffcc"
| 57
| March 5
| L.A. Lakers
| W 94–85
|
|
|
| Target Center
| 19–38
|- align="center" bgcolor="#ffcccc"
| 58
| March 7
| Seattle
|- align="center" bgcolor="#ffcccc"
| 59
| March 10
| Phoenix
|- align="center" bgcolor="#ffcccc"
| 60
| March 12
| @ Chicago
| L 99–131
|
|
|
| Chicago Stadium
| 19–41
|- align="center" bgcolor="#ccffcc"
| 62
| March 15
| @ Seattle
|- align="center" bgcolor="#ffcccc"
| 64
| March 19
| Houston
|- align="center" bgcolor="#ffcccc"
| 67
| March 23
| @ Utah
| L 89–95
|
|
|
| Salt Palace
| 22–45
|- align="center" bgcolor="#ffcccc"
| 68
| March 26
| @ Phoenix
|- align="center" bgcolor="#ffcccc"
| 69
| March 29
| @ Seattle
|- align="center" bgcolor="#ffcccc"
| 70
| March 30
| @ Portland
| L 91–121
|
|
|
| Memorial Coliseum
| 22–48

|- align="center" bgcolor="#ffcccc"
| 71
| April 2
| Portland
| L 93–104
|
|
|
| Target Center
| 22–49
|- align="center" bgcolor="#ffcccc"
| 73
| April 5
| @ Detroit
| L 82–101
|
|
|
| The Palace of Auburn Hills
| 23–50
|- align="center" bgcolor="#ffcccc"
| 74
| April 7
| San Antonio
|- align="center" bgcolor="#ccffcc"
| 76
| April 11
| Atlanta
|- align="center" bgcolor="#ccffcc"
| 78
| April 14
| @ Philadelphia
| W 96–88
|
|
|
| The Spectrum
| 26–52
|- align="center" bgcolor="#ccffcc"
| 81
| April 19
| Milwaukee

Player statistics

Awards and records
 Felton Spencer, NBA All-Rookie Team 2nd Team

Transactions

References

See also
 1990-91 NBA season

Minnesota Timberwolves seasons
Timber
Timber
Monnesota